Judith Louise MacManus-Driscoll is a Professor of Materials Science at the University of Cambridge. Driscoll is known for her interdisciplinary work on thin film engineering. She has a particular focus on functional oxide systems, demonstrating new ways to engineer thin films to meet the required applications performance. She has worked extensively in the fields of high temperature superconductors, ferroics and multiferroics, ionics, and semiconductors. She holds several licensed patents.

Research and career 
Driscoll (also known as MacManus-Driscoll in her publications) earned her PhD in 1991 at the University of Cambridge under Profs. Jan Evetts and Derek Fray FRS. 

From 1991 to 1995, she trained as a postdoctoral researcher at Stanford University and IBM Almaden Research Center where she worked under Ted Geballe, Robby Beyers  and John Bravman. In 1995, she joined Imperial College London as a lecturer in the Department of Materials, and was promoted to Reader in 1999. She then did a sabbatical at Los Alamos National Laboratory in 2003 where she has remained a visiting staff member/visiting faculty ever since. She joined the University of Cambridge in the Department of Materials Science and Metallurgy in 2003, and was promoted to Full Professor in 2008. She is a Fellow of Trinity College, Cambridge  and Royal Academy of Engineering Chair in Emerging Technologies in advanced memory materials.

Driscoll was founding editor-in-chief of the American Institute of Physics's journal APL Materials and held the position for 10 years from 2013.

Honours and awards 
 2011 Elected Fellow of the American Physical Society
2015 Elected Materials Research Society Fellow
 2015 Institute of Physics Joule Medal and Prize
 2015 Royal Academy of Engineering Armourers and Brasiers' Company Prize
 2017 Institute of Electrical and Electronics Engineers James Wong Award
 2017 Elected Fellow of Women's Engineering Society
 2017 Elected Chartered Engineer
 2018 Institute of Materials, Minerals and Mining Kroll Prize
 2021 Elected American Association for the Advancement of Science Fellow
 2022. Institute of Materials, Minerals and Mining Griffith Medal
 2022  MRSI Silver Jubilee International Medal

References 

Living people
Alumni of the University of Cambridge
Alumni of Imperial College London
British materials scientists
Fellows of Trinity College, Cambridge
Fellows of the Institute of Physics
Fellows of the Royal Academy of Engineering
Female Fellows of the Royal Academy of Engineering
Women materials scientists and engineers
British women scientists
20th-century British scientists
21st-century British scientists
21st-century women engineers
Fellows of the American Physical Society
20th-century women engineers
Year of birth missing (living people)
Fellows of the Institute of Materials, Minerals and Mining